John McLeod (12 March 1866 – 4 February 1953) was a Scottish footballer who played as a goalkeeper.

Career
McLeod played for Dumbarton Athletic, Dumbarton, Rangers and Scotland.

Honours
Dumbarton
 Scottish League: Champions 1890-1891;1891-1892
 Scottish Cup: Runners Up 1890-1891
 Dumbartonshire Cup: Winners 1889–90;1890–91;1891-1892;1892-1893;1893–94;1894–95
 League Charity Cup: Winners 1890-91 
 Greenock Charity Cup: Winners 1889-90 Runners Up 1891-92
 4 caps for Scotland between 1889 and 1893
 2 caps for the Scottish League between 1891 and 1893
 1 representative cap for Scotland against Canada XI in 1891
 4 representative caps for Dumbartonshire
 3 international trial matches for Scotland between 1890 and 1893.

See also
List of Scotland national football team captains

References

Sources

External links

London Hearts profile (Scotland)
London Hearts profile (Scottish League)

1866 births
1953 deaths
Scottish footballers
Scotland international footballers
Dumbarton F.C. players
Rangers F.C. players
Association football goalkeepers
Scottish Football League players
Scottish Football League representative players
Place of death missing